Bassareus is a genus of case-bearing leaf beetles in the family Chrysomelidae. There are about eight described species in Bassareus.

Species
 Bassareus areolatus (Suffrian, 1852)
 Bassareus brunnipes (Olivier, 1791)
 Bassareus clathratus (F. E. Melsheimer, 1847)
 Bassareus croceipennis J. L. LeConte, 1880
 Bassareus detritus (Olivier, 1808)
 Bassareus formosus (F. E. Melsheimer, 1847)
 Bassareus lituratus (Fabricius, 1801)
 Bassareus mammifer (Newman, 1840)

References

Further reading

 
 
 
 
 

Cryptocephalinae
Chrysomelidae genera